The Mississippi River Transmission pipeline is a natural gas pipeline which brings natural gas from CenterPoint Energy Gas Transmission into Louisiana from Arkansas, and also into the Midwest. It is owned by CenterPoint Energy. Its FERC code is 25.

References

External links
 Pipeline Electronic Bulletin Board

Natural gas pipelines in the United States
Natural gas pipelines in Louisiana
Natural gas pipelines in Arkansas